The Santa Clara Broncos baseball team is the varsity intercollegiate baseball team that represents Santa Clara University in NCAA Division I college baseball. Santa Clara Baseball competes in the West Coast Conference, of which the Santa Clara Broncos were a charter member. The Broncos play their home games on campus at Stephen Schott Stadium, which opened in 2005. The Broncos and are led by head coach Rusty Filter, currently in his fifth season.

Having begun play in 1883, Santa Clara is currently in its 129th season of varsity baseball, and has enjoyed a long history of baseball excellence. Santa Clara has won 11 Conference Pennants, and appeared in 12 NCAA Tournaments, including a runner-up finish in the 1962 College World Series. Individually, 34 Broncos have been named All-Americans, and 158 players have been drafted in the MLB Draft, with 48 players making it to the Major Leagues.

History

The early years

Baseball is the oldest sport at Santa Clara, with the first recorded season coming in 1883. Prior to that, Santa Clara students had long engaged in baseball games against one another. Santa Clara's first intercollegiate baseball game came in 1883, when the Jesuit fathers finally allowed Santa Clara students to take an overnight trip to play fledgling Saint Mary's College, then located in San Francisco. Santa Clara lost the game, but began an athletic relationship with Saint Mary's that has blossomed into one of the oldest and most heated athletic rivalries in the west. For years, it was a long-standing tradition for Santa Clara and Saint Mary's to play on St. Patricks day. Early opponents like Pacific (1895), and Stanford (1892) remain fixtures on Santa Clara's baseball schedules 125 years later.

The seriousness that the students and administration gave to baseball is reflected in the caliber of coaches that were hired by the school. Early managers like Billy Hulen, Joe Corbett, Jay Hughes, Jimmy Byrnes, and Patsy O'Rourke were all former major league players who had made the trek west to coach baseball at what was the known as Santa Clara College. 

Santa Clara's Frank Arellanes was the first Hispanic professional baseball player, who played for the Boston Red Sox in 1908. Another Bronco baseball player from the early period was Harry Wolter, who recorded the first hit in then-new Fenway Park as a member of the Red Sox. Elmer Stricklett, who played at Santa Clara and made his way to the Major Leagues, is considered the inventor of the spitball.

The most notable contributor to Santa Clara Baseball was 1898 graduate Charlie Graham. A Santa Clara native, Graham played two years of baseball at Santa Clara, returned to teach Latin and Greek, as well as coach from 1901–1903. Graham then embarked on a baseball career which saw him rise from obscurity in the western minor leagues to becoming the starting catcher for the Boston Americans, and star pitcher Cy Young. Unfortunately, Graham was heartbroken by the news of the 1906 San Francisco earthquake, ending his career only a few months into the season. He returned home, and ultimately became the owner of the San Francisco Seals, and donated generously to Santa Clara and the baseball program. The University's largest dormitory, Graham Hall, is named in his honor.

Due to the nature of College Baseball in the Pre-War years, Santa Clara had no conference affiliation and made no post-season appearances in the early years, as those things had yet to come into existence. However, the competitiveness of the Santa Clara teams from prior to 1946 is exhibited in the number of Major League players produced in this period, notably Harry Wolter (Major League debut in 1907), Elmer Stricklett (1904), Hardin Barry (1912), Justin Fitzgerald (1911),  Hal Chase (1905), Charlie Graham (1906), Tillie Shafer (1908), Frank Arellanes (1908), William Hogan (1911), Erv Kantlehner (1914), Frank Shellenback (1918), Bevo LeBourveau (1919), Bill Lawrence (1932), Jim O'Connell (1923), Marv Owen (1931), and Les Powers (1938).

Wartime cancellation, post-war success

Santa Clara was forced to cancel the baseball program for two seasons, 1943 and 1944, due to wartime restrictions and a devotion of resources and manpower to the war effort, though baseball remained a popular form of recreation on campus.

Following the end of the war, Santa Clara returned to the diamond and found immediate success under John "Paddy" Cottrell, who coached the team from 1946 to 1951. Cottrell retired in 1951, but after watching Santa Clara languish under subsequent coaches, the University and Alumni asked him to come out of retirement in 1961. With Cottrell at the helm things began to fall into place for Santa Clara.

Santa Clara, along with Stanford, California, USC, and Others, formed the California Intercollegiate Baseball Association in 1960. For the first time in their already 80-year-long history, Santa Clara baseball had a conference home. The CIBA stood as one of the preeminent baseball conferences, and allowed Santa Clara to recruit the highest possible caliber of player. Though Santa Clara stumbled in Cottrell's first year at the helm, in 1962 the Broncos jumped out to an impressive start, and held the #1 spot in the polls for almost the entirety of the 1962 season. The baseball crazed Bay Area, who had just received their first major league franchises a few years earlier, lent their full support to the Broncos. During this season, Santa Clara games were first made available by radio broadcast. Led by five future major leaguers – Bob Garibaldi, Ernie Fazio, John Boccabella, Pete Magrini, and Tim Cullen, the Broncos found their way to the College World Series finals. In heartbreaking fashion, Santa Clara fell to Michigan on a 15th inning passed ball. Bob Garibaldi was the College World Series MVP, and became the first player to have a million dollar signing bonus.

The success of the 1962 Broncos helped spur the fundraising efforts that lead to the building of Buck Shaw Stadium, home to Bronco baseball from 1963 until they moved to a baseball specific venue in 2005, Stephen Schott Stadium.  John Cottrell, in his second stint as the Bronco manager from 1961–64, amassed a 102–44 record, good for a .699 winning percentage.  Collectively, the Broncos won nearly 70% of their games from 1961–1979.

Taormina takes over

He was followed as manager by Sal Taormina, who went 511–249 from 1965–1979, a .672 winning percentage. "Dirty" Al Gallagher, a future major leaguer, helped ease the transition from Cottrell to Taormina.

The CIBA Era ended when the WCAC, the former name of the modern WCC, began sponsoring baseball in 1968. The Broncos reeled off Conference championships and NCAA tournament appearances for four consecutive years, followed by three straight second-place finishes, setting the early tone that Santa Clara would be a name to respect in WCC baseball. To date, only Pepperdine holds more League Titles, NCAA Tournament Appearances, and College World Series appearances than the Broncos.

In his final year as Head Coach at SCU, Taormina took the Broncos back to the NCAA tournament in 1978.

Hot and cold

After the retirement of Coach Taormina, the Broncos were led by Al Endriss and Jerry McClain, neither of whom could replicate the success that Coach Taormina had sustained over his tenure. Santa Clara, however, found a dependable manager once again when alumnus John Oldham took the reins in 1985. Oldham would coach the Broncos for 12 seasons, leading SCU to 4 NCAA tournaments appearances, first in 1988, and then in 1994, 1996, and 1997. Notable players to play for Oldham include John Savage, Randy Winn, and San Francisco Mayor Gavin Newsom. Santa Clara's Randy Winn, who also played basketball for the Broncos, enjoyed a decade long Major League career, and helped lead the Broncos to the NCAA tournament in basketball in 1994.

For 8 seasons, from 1977 to 1984, the WCAC ceased to sponsor baseball, and the Broncos found a home in the NCBA, the Northern California Baseball Association. Santa Clara and rival Fresno State dominated NCBA competition, as the Broncos and Bulldogs were the only teams to win the NCBA championship while the league existed. Santa Clara won the league twice in their stay, and appeared in the NCAA tournament in 1978. In 1985, the Broncos returned to the WCAC, which shortened its name to the WCC in 1988.

Santa Clara's success has been peculiar, as in the NCAA tournament era, the Broncos have been coached by 11 men, but only 4 have taken the Broncos to the Tournament- Bill Leonard, Paddy Cottrell, Sal Taormina, and John Oldham. Still the Broncos 12 NCAA tournament trips ranks good enough for second all-time in the WCC. Santa Clara's baseball team has enjoyed periods of being both hot and cold, the history of Santa Clara baseball can be summed as having sustained success and NCAA tournament appearances under those four long tenured coaches, but sitting on sitting on the outside looking in while coached by anyone else.

In 1998, Santa Clara introduced Mark O'Brien as head coach. O'Brien would stay until 2011, in a tenure characterized by tantalizingly close results, with many years finishing in the top third of the conference, but never winning a conference title or making an NCAA tournament trip.

Despite a string of 4 consecutive 1st and 2nd-place finished from 2001 to 2004 under Mark O'Brien, Santa Clara has not returned to the NCAA tournament since 1997.  While at the helm of the Broncos, Mark O'Brien and his staff were said to have struggled to compete in recruiting while playing at the outdated multi-purpose Buck Shaw Stadium. Santa Clara responded by building the $8.6 million Stephen Schott Stadium, a 1,500 seat state-of-the-art baseball specific venue that is one of the finest facilities of its size on the West Coast. The stadium was financed in large part by Santa Clara Alumnus Stephen Schott, a varsity baseball player in 1960, and at that time, owner of the Oakland Athletics.

However, the push to the top that the University and boosters expected from the new facility didn't materialize. From 2000–2004, the last seasons at Buck Shaw, the Broncos never finished lower than third place. However, when the Broncos moved to the new Stephen Schott Stadium, Mark O'Brien never lead the Broncos to anything higher than third, and twice finished as low as eighth. Since playing in a conference for the first time in 1960, the Broncos had never finished lower than fifth, and that had only happened three times in the 45-year span of conference play prior to moving to Schott.

Because of these disappointing results for the historic program in a brand new facility, Mark O'Brien was fired in 2011 and replaced with longtime UCSD manager, Dan O'Brien, no relation.

Mark O'Brien's tenure was not without notable products—Santa Clara's Daniel Nava made an improbable run from SCU baseball manager to a contributing player on the 2013 Red Sox, who won the world series, and Santa Clara's Tommy Medica made his MLB debut in 2013 for the San Diego Padres.

Dan O'Brien and the "relentless development" era
Dan O'Brien, the 43rd manager of the Santa Clara Baseball program, came to Santa Clara from University of California, San Diego, where he was a player, assistant coach, and then head coach for a total of 16 seasons. O'Brien had led the Tritons from Division III to Division II, building the program into a national championship contender. He had led the Tritons to the NCAA Division II baseball tournament six times, and twice to the Division II College World Series, finishing as runner-up in 2010.

O'Brien began the task of rebuilding the Bronco baseball program, leading the Broncos to a 26–28 record and a 9th-place finish in the WCC. Following the loss of the top five pitchers from 2012, Santa Clara sank to its lowest baseball nadir, finishing in last for the second year in a row with a 1–23 mark in the WCC. Despite the early rebuilding struggles, in 2014 O'Brien guided the Broncos to a 16–11 record in league play, their best record in the WCC since 2003, which earned them their first ever berth in the WCC Baseball Tournament. The four-team tournament was introduced in 2013, replacing the two-team championship that the conference had used since 1998. The appearance in the WCC Tournament marked the first time that Santa Clara had appeared in the post-season in 16 years.

O'Brien vowed to return to Santa Clara to the baseball prominence it had enjoyed for nearly 110 years prior to the struggles of the Broncos since the retirement of John Oldham. O'Brien placed an emphasis on constant player development, with a system he called "relentless development". In addition, O'Brien felt that Santa Clara had shifted away from the old-school baseball mentality that once had characterized the program. As a result, Santa Clara introduced throwback uniforms in the 2013 season which were based on the uniforms worn by the Broncos in the late 1930s.

Rusty Filter Era
Rusty Filter was brought in as the 44th manager of the Santa Clara Baseball program in June 2017; after spending the previous eight years at Stanford where he was among the top pitching coaches in the nation. In his first season at the helm, Filter led the Broncos to a 26–26 record and a 6th place finish in the WCC, doubling the Broncos win total from the 2017 season. The Broncos could not build on the season in 2019, finishing the season with a 12–40 record overall, including 5–22 in WCC play, leading to finishing 10th in the conference. With two years two learn Filter's style of play, and 18 seniors on the roster, the Broncos got off to a hot start to the 2020 season with a 12–5 record. Two of the 12 wins were against top 25 teams in #25 Stanford at home and #3 Georgia on the road. Just before conference play started, the NCAA canceled all spring sports for the remainder of their respective seasons due to the COVID-19 pandemic. It was announced in May that 15 of the 18 seniors would be returning for their extra year of eligibility in 2021, granted by the NCAA to all spring athletes.

Santa Clara University conference history 
 1960–1967: CIBA
 1968–1976: West Coast (Athletic) Conference
 1977–1984: NCBA
 1985–present: West Coast Conference

Santa Clara Baseball Stadium History 
The Santa Clara Baseball team played their home games on campus at Buck Shaw Stadium from 1963 to 2004. Prior to 1963, Santa Clara played their games at the extant Washington Field, a large diamond located on the campus of Santa Clara High School, now Buchsher Middle School. A new era for Santa Clara University baseball began on April 30, 2005 with the sold-out opening of Stephen Schott Stadium. The $8.6 million project was kicked off in January, 2004 with a $4 million pledge from former SCU baseball player and former owner of the Oakland Athletics, Stephen Schott. The 1,500-seat stadium houses the entire Santa Clara baseball program, including its training, practice and equipment facilities. Also equipped with a 600 square-foot press box and VIP suite, Schott Stadium is one of the premier college baseball stadiums on the West Coast. Designed with player development in mind, Schott Stadium provides the Santa Clara baseball staff and players with every possible tool for success.

Coaching Records

Year By Year results

Program Records

Awards

All-Americans

Conference award winners

In the Pros

Former Major Leaguer Baseball Players 
 Lou Berberet (New York Yankees)
 John Boccabella (Chicago Cubs)
 Bruce Bochte (Los Angeles Angels)
 Nelson Briles (St. Louis Cardinals)
 Scott Chiamparino (Texas Rangers)
 Victor Cole (Pittsburgh Pirates)
 Mike Crudale (St. Louis Cardinals)
 Tim Cullen (Washington Senators)
 Jan Dukes (Washington Senators)
 Ernie Fazio (Colt .45’s)
 Mike Frank (Cincinnati Reds)
 Al Gallagher (San Francisco Giants)
 Bob Garibaldi (San Francisco Giants)
 Ed Giovanola (Atlanta Braves)
 Greg Gohr (Detroit Tigers)
 Pat Jacquez (Chicago White Sox)
 Pat Larkin (San Francisco Giants)
 Larry Loughlin (Philadelphia Phillies)
 Mike Macfarlane (Kansas City Royals)
 Pete Magrini (Boston Red Sox)
 Adam Melhuse (Los Angeles Dodgers)
 Fran Mullins (Chicago White Sox)
 Jim O’Rourke (St. Louis Cardinals)
 Bill Renna (New York Yankees)
 Rich Robertson (San Francisco Giants)
 Roger Samuels (San Francisco Giants)
 Bob Spence (Chicago White Sox)
 Elmer Stricklett
 Rich Troedson (San Diego Padres)
 Jim Wilhelm (San Diego Padres)
 Randy Winn (Tampa Bay Rays)

NOTE: Team listed in parentheses is the Major League Baseball team they played for during their professional debut.

Current Minor League Baseball players 
 Daniel Nava: Pawtucket Red Sox – Triple-A International League (Boston Red Sox)
 Kris Watts: Altoona Curve – Double-A Eastern League (Pittsburgh Pirates)
 Matt Long: Inland Empire 66ers – Class A Advanced California League (LA Angels)
 Jon Karcich: Inland Empire 66ers – Class A Advanced California League (LA Angels)
 Mark Willinsky: Brevard County Manatees – Class A Florida League (Milwaukee Brewers)
 Matt Wickswat: Winston-Salem Dash – Class A Advanced Carolina League (Chi. White Sox)
 Evan LeBlanc: Savannah Sand Gnats – Class A South Atlantic League (NY Mets)
 Nate Garcia: Bowling Green Hot Rods – Class A Midwest League (Tampa Bay Rays)
 Geoff Klein: Quad Cities River Bandits – Class A Midwest League (St. Louis Cardinals)
 Tommy Medica: Fort Wayne TinCaps – Class A Midwest League (San Diego Padres)
 Alex Rivers: Idaho Falls Chukars – Rookie Pioneer League (Kansas City Royals)
 J.R. Graham: Danville Braves- Appalachian Rookie League (Atlanta Braves)
 Patrick Terry: Chico Outlaws- North American Baseball American League (Independent)

Santa Clara's Major League Baseball Draft history 

 * indicates June Secondary Draft
 ^ indicates January Secondary Draft

See also
List of NCAA Division I baseball programs

References

External links
 

 
Baseball teams established in 1883
1883 establishments in California

es:Santa Clara Broncos